Martina (Rita) Caramignoli (born 25 May 1991) is an Italian freestyle swimmer. She competed at the 2020 Summer Olympics, in 800 m freestyle and 1500 m freestyle.

She won a bronze medal in the 1500 m at the 2014 European Aquatics Championships.

Martina Caramignoli is an athlete of the Gruppo Sportivo Fiamme Oro.

At the 2022 European Aquatics Championships, contested in Rome in August, Caramignoli won the bronze medal in the 1500 metre freestyle, finishing in a time of 16:12.39, which was less than 20 seconds behind gold medalist and fellow Italian Simona Quadarella.

Education
She currently studies Agriculture at the University of Pisa.

References

1991 births
Living people
Italian female freestyle swimmers
Italian female swimmers
Universiade medalists in swimming
Universiade gold medalists for Italy
Universiade silver medalists for Italy
Swimmers of Fiamme Oro
Medalists at the 2013 Summer Universiade
Medalists at the 2015 Summer Universiade
European Aquatics Championships medalists in swimming
Swimmers at the 2020 Summer Olympics
20th-century Italian women
21st-century Italian women
Swimmers at the 2022 Mediterranean Games
Mediterranean Games bronze medalists for Italy
Mediterranean Games medalists in swimming